The Vineyard Life Church, Richmond, which is a member of the Evangelical Alliance, was formed in 2013 as the result of a merger between Richmond Borough Church and The Vineyard Church, Richmond. It meets in a 19th-century church building located in the London Borough of Richmond upon Thames. The congregation run a community centre, a food bank and a charity shop, and also use the building as a music venue for young people.

History of the building 
The church building, with a gallery, was designed by John Davies (1796–1865) for the Anglican parish: it opened in 1831, to seat a congregation of 500 to 600.  It was rebuilt in 1851 after a fire. The church is built in Norman style, in grey brick, with a distinctive porch.

It was attended by Harold Wilson, with his wife Mary, during his term in office as British Prime Minister; and Lady Stansgate, mother of the Labour MP Tony Benn, was a parishioner during the 1940s.

Between 1971 and 1972, future British Prime Minister Tony Blair and his friend Al Collenette held weekly discos at the church.

References

External links 
 The Vineyard Life Church website
 Vineyard Community Centre website
 Richmond's Congregational Church in The Vineyard: articles on the Richmond Local History Society's website

1831 establishments in England
2013 establishments in England
Churches completed in 1851
Churches in the London Borough of Richmond upon Thames
Evangelical churches in London
Richmond, London
Romanesque Revival church buildings in England
The Vineyard, Richmond